John Joseph Buckley (July 5, 1916 – February 3, 1997) was an American politician who served on the Massachusetts Governor's Council and as the Mayor of Lawrence, Massachusetts. He was an unsuccessful candidate for Treasurer and Receiver-General of Massachusetts in 1964.

References

   
  
  

1916 births
1997 deaths
Mayors of Lawrence, Massachusetts
Georgetown University alumni
Members of the Massachusetts Governor's Council
Massachusetts Democrats
20th-century American politicians
Catholics from Massachusetts
United States Army personnel of World War II
United States Army officers